Chesham and Amersham is a parliamentary constituency in Buckinghamshire, South East England, represented in the House of Commons by Sarah Green, a Liberal Democrat elected at a 2021 by-election.

History

Contents and regional context
The seat was created for the general election in February 1974. It comprises the southern part of the former Rural District of Amersham, including Amersham and the Chalfonts, previously part of the abolished constituency of South Buckinghamshire; and Chesham and the northern part of the former Rural District, transferred from Aylesbury.

Political history and demography
The local authority is in Buckinghamshire Council and the seat coincides with the abolished Chiltern District. It includes the towns of Chesham and Amersham and outlying villages within the Metropolitan Green Belt. The area is connected with Central London by the Metropolitan Line of the London Underground, as well as the London to Aylesbury Line and the Chiltern Main Line, both operated by Chiltern Railways. The constituency is also close to the M40 and M25 motorways. It is home to many affluent professionals. The two main towns are the only part of London Underground network amid an Area of Outstanding Natural Beauty (see Chiltern Hills as to which).

Until the 2021 by-election was won by the Liberal Democrats candidate, the previous general election results in the seat since its creation had seen a Conservative winning margin of between 10,416 (Feb 1974) and 23,920 (2015) votes, in each case an absolute majority of the votes cast.  In each of the general elections except two the Liberals, or subsequently Liberal Democrats, had come second, with results as high as 31.15 per cent of the votes cast. Labour came second only once, in 2017, when it achieved its best ever result of 20.6 per cent. UKIP came second in 2015, Labour in 2017 and the Liberal Democrats in 2019.

Dame Cheryl Gillan MP died in office on 4 April 2021, and the seat was gained by the Liberal Democrats’ pro-EU Sarah Green in the subsequent by-election on 17 June 2021 with a majority of 8,028 votes.  The Liberal Democrat win in the 2021 Chesham and Amersham by-election was seen as an upset in a historically safe Conservative seat, and party leader Sir Ed Davey tweeted that the result had "sent a shockwave through British politics".

In June 2016, an estimated 55 per cent of adults voting in the EU referendum in the constituency voted to remain in the European Union, compared with 48% in the UK as a whole. The estimated turnout of 83.6 per cent was the highest in any constituency in the UK, the only higher turnout in the referendum being in Gibraltar. In the 2019 EU Parliament elections more than 50 per cent voted for parties supporting continued UK membership of the EU, although the turnout was only 42.8 per cent. The pro-EU Liberal Democrats were the most popular party with 31.9 per cent, with the pro-Leave Brexit Party in second place on 30 per cent. Despite the seat's support for remaining in the EU, its pro-Brexit MP, Dame Cheryl Gillan, was re-elected in both generals elections held after the 2016 referendum (in the case of 2017 with her highest vote share since her first election in 1992), albeit with slightly reduced majorities.

Boundaries and boundary changes 

1974–1983: The Urban District of Chesham, and the Rural District of Amersham.

1983–1997: The District of Chiltern wards of Amersham Common, Amersham-on-the-Hill, Amersham Town, Asheridge Vale, Ashley Green and Latimer, Austenwood, Chalfont Common, Chalfont St Giles, Chalfont St Peter Central, Chartridge, Chenies, Chesham Bois and Weedon Hill, Cholesbury and The Lee, Coleshill and Penn Street, Gold Hill, Hilltop, Holmer Green, Little Chalfont, Little Missenden, Lowndes, Newtown, Penn, Pond Park, St Mary's, Seer Green and Jordans, Townsend, and Waterside, and the District of Wycombe wards of Hazlemere North and Hazlemere South.

Hazlemere was transferred from Wycombe. Great Missenden was transferred to Aylesbury.

1997–2010: All the wards of the District of Chiltern except the wards of Ballinger and South Heath, Great Missenden, and Prestwood and Heath End, and the District of Wycombe wards of Hazlemere Central, Hazlemere East and Hazlemere West.

Minor changes.

2010–present: The District of Chiltern wards of Amersham Common, Amersham-on-the-Hill, Amersham Town, Asheridge Vale and Lowndes, Ashley Green, Latimer and Chenies, Austenwood, Ballinger, South Heath and Chartridge, Central, Chalfont Common, Chalfont St Giles, Chesham Bois and Weedon Hill, Cholesbury, The Lee and Bellingdon, Gold Hill, Great Missenden, Hilltop and Townsend, Holmer Green, Little Chalfont, Little Missenden, Newtown, Penn and Coleshill, Prestwood and Heath End, Ridgeway, St Mary's and Waterside, Seer Green, and Vale.

Great Missenden transferred back from Aylesbury and Hazlemere returned to Wycombe.

Members of Parliament 
The present Member of Parliament for Chesham and Amersham is the Liberal Democrat Sarah Green MP who was elected at the 2021 by-election.  Previous MPs were the Conservative Cheryl Gillan, who held the position from 1992 until her death in 2021. and Ian Gilmour.

Elections

Elections in the 2020s

Cheryl Gillan died on 4 April 2021, triggering a by-election held on 17 June 2021.

Elections in the 2010s

Elections in the 2000s

Elections in the 1990s

Elections in the 1980s

Elections in the 1970s

See also 
 List of parliamentary constituencies in Buckinghamshire

References

External links 
nomis Constituency Profile for Chesham and Amersham — presenting data from the ONS annual population survey and other official statistics.

Parliamentary constituencies in Buckinghamshire
Constituencies of the Parliament of the United Kingdom established in 1974
Chesham
Chiltern District